Lieutenant General Marquis Hainse CMM, MSC, CD is a Canadian Army officer who served as Chief of the Army Staff and Commander of the Canadian Army.

Military career
Hainse joined the Canadian Forces in 1977 and was commissioned into the Royal 22e Régiment in 1980. He was deployed during the Oka Crisis in 1990 and again during the North American Ice Storm of 1998. He became Commanding Officer of 1st Battalion Royal 22e Régiment at Port-au-Prince in Haiti in 1996, Chief of Staff of Land Force Quebec Area in 2001 and Commander of the Bosnia and Herzegovina Task Force in April 2002. He went on to be senior officer in charge of international operations at the National Defence Headquarters later in 2002, Commander of 5 Canadian Mechanized Brigade Group in September 2004 and Chief of Staff of Canada Command in Ottawa in July 2006. He then served in Afghanistan as Deputy Commander Regional Command South in 2007 and became Commander of Land Force Doctrine and Training System in May 2008 before becoming Chief of Programme at National Defence Headquarters in Ottawa in August 2010 and then Deputy Commander Allied Joint Force Command Naples in 2011.

Hainse became Chief of the Army Staff and Commander of the Canadian Army in July 2013. It was announced on 19 January 2016 that Hainse would be replaced as Commander of the Canadian Army and would serve as the military representative at NATO Headquarters in Brussels. His replacement would be Major-General Paul Wynnyk.

References

Year of birth missing (living people)
Living people
Canadian generals
Commanders of the Order of Military Merit (Canada)
Recipients of the Meritorious Service Decoration
Commanders of the Canadian Army
Royal 22nd Regiment officers